Sending of Flowers (French: Envoi de fleurs) is a 1950 French historical drama film directed by Jean Stelli and starring Tino Rossi, Micheline Francey and Jean Brochard. The film portrays the life of the composer Paul Delmet.

Cast
 Tino Rossi as Paul Delmet  
 Micheline Francey as Suzanne  
 Jean Brochard as Hippolyte  
 Albert Dinan as Rodolphe Salis 
 Arlette Merry as Sophie  
 Milly Mathis as Mme Sammos  
 André Dumas as Albert Mourssac 
 André Marnay as Le curé  
 Charles Lemontier as Fragerolles, un membre du 'Chat noir' 
 Jean Berton as Un membre du 'Chat noir'  
 Yvonne Dany 
 Paul Demange as Un spectateur timoré  
 Monique Gérard 
 Mag-Avril as Une bourgeoise  
 René Marc as Un membre du 'Chat noir'  
 Frédéric Mariotti as Le plâtrier  
 Georges Paulais as Un bourgeois  
 Hélène Pépée 
 Hélène Rémy 
 Renée Thorel 
 Edmond Van Daële as Le bedeau

References

Bibliography 
 Rège, Philippe. Encyclopedia of French Film Directors, Volume 1. Scarecrow Press, 2009.

External links 
 

1950 films
1950s historical drama films
French historical drama films
1950s French-language films
Films directed by Jean Stelli
1950 drama films
French black-and-white films
1950s French films